Pop Idol (American Idol in North America) is a rhythm video game developed by Hothouse Creations and published by Codemasters for PlayStation 2, Microsoft Windows and Game Boy Advance. It is based on the reality talent show franchise Idol. The American version uses footage from  its second season.

Reception

Pop Idol received "generally unfavorable" reviews, according to review aggregator Metacritic.

X-Play gave the game a 1 out of 5, complaining about the gameplay consisting of pressing buttons in time to judge the character's singing and not on the player's actual singing.

Related games
In addition to the release of Karaoke Revolution Presents: American Idol for the PlayStation 2 on January 2, 2007, a sequel Karaoke Revolution Presents: American Idol Encore was released during the 1st quarter of 2008 following its direct sequel Karaoke Revolution Presents: American Idol Encore 2 which was released on November 18, 2008.

An iPhone application entitled American Idol: The Game was released on the App Store. It was released by Electronic Arts on July 3, 2009. Omaha Sternberg of Macworld rated the game 4.5 out of 5 stars. The application has received mixed reviews from its users.

References

External links

2003 video games
American Idol
Game Boy Advance games
Multiplayer and single-player video games
Cancelled Xbox games
Music video games
PlayStation 2 games
Video games based on television series
Video games developed in the United Kingdom
Video games scored by Adam Gubman
Windows games
Hothouse Creations games